Sommacampagna is a town and comune in the province of Verona, Veneto, northern Italy. As of 2017, its population was of 14,746.

History

The town was founded during the Ancient Roman period, with the name of Summa Campanea.

In the frazione of Custoza two battles were fought during the Italian Independence Wars: the first in 1848 and the second in 1866.

Geography
The municipality is part of the urban area of Verona and borders with Sona, Valeggio sul Mincio, Verona and Villafranca di Verona. It counts the hamlets (frazioni) of Caselle and Custoza.

Demographics

Culture
The town's most famous sagra is called "Antica Fiera di Sommacampagna" and takes place every year during the last weekend of August, usually from Thursday to Tuesday.

Transport
Sommacampagna is served by the A4 motorway at the homonym exit. It counts a railway station (Sommacampagna-Sona) on the Milan-Venice railway, and the Airport of Verona-Villafranca is partially located in its municipal territory, nearby Caselle.

Sport
The town's main football team is Associazione Calcio Somma.

Gallery

Personalities
Gidino di Sommacampagna (1320-1400), poet
Federico Bricolo (b. 1966), politician

Twin towns
 Hall in Tirol, Austria (since 2003)

References

External links

 Sommacampagna official website
 Sommacampagna on tuttocitta.it

Cities and towns in Veneto